England is an English and Irish surname. Notable people with the surname include:

 Andrew England Kerr (born 1958), British politician
 Anthony W. England, American astronaut
 Arthur J. England Jr. (1932–2013), American jurist and lawyer
 Audie England, American actress and photographer
 Ben England, British choir director 
 Benjamin England (1647–1711), English politician
 Bethany England (born 1994), English footballer
 Darren England (born 1985), English football referee
 Dave England, American stuntman 
 England Dan and John Ford Coley, American music duo
 George England, see George England (disambiguation)
 Jen England, American model and actress
 John C. England (1920–1941), United States Navy officer
 Lee England Jr. (born 1984), American violinist
 Lofty England (1911–1995), Jaguar Cars' motorsport manager in the 1950s, and later company CEO
 Lynndie England, a participant in the prisoner abuse incident at Abu Ghraib prison
 Matthew England, Australian climate scientist
 Michael England (1918–2007), English cricketer
 Mike England, Welsh international footballer and manager
 Nora England (born 1946), American linguist
 Nora England (1887–1970), British artist
 Odette England (born 1975), Australian-British photographer
 Paul England (1929–2014), Australian former racing driver
 Paul England (1893–1968), English actor, singer, author, and translator
 Peter England (born 1993), English professional wrestler better known as Pete Dunne
 Poole England (1787–1884)
 Roye England, founder of Pendon Museum, England
 Ruth England (born 1970), British television presenter and actress
 Sandhurst England (1856–1903), Australian-born New Zealand cricketer
 Sarah K. England, American physiologist and biophysicist

See also
 England (disambiguation)
 English monarch, who/se family may be addressed with the pseudo-surname "England"
 Mr England (disambiguation)

English-language surnames
English toponymic surnames
Surnames of British Isles origin
Surnames of English origin